Robert Brennan (22 July 1881 – 13 November 1964) was an Irish writer, diplomat and a founder of The Irish Press newspaper. He took part in the 1916 Easter Rising and later became the Irish Free State's first minister to the United States.  He was the father of Irish-American author and New Yorker columnist Maeve Brennan.

Life
Brennan was born at John's Gate Street, Wexford, the son of Robert Brennan, a victualler, and Bridget Kearney. He was a member of the staff of the Enniscorthy Echo. He joined the Gaelic League and the Irish Volunteers and was recruited into the IRB by Seán T. O'Kelly. He married Úna Brennan who was also active in the republican movement and had her sworn into the IRB. She was with him in Wexford for the 1916 Easter Rising.

He commanded the insurgents in Wexford during the 1916 Easter Rising and, along with other leaders Seamus Rafter and Seán Etchingham, was sentenced to death. The sentence was commuted to penal servitude. His continuing political activity resulted in further imprisonments in 1917 and afterwards. His daughter Maeve Brennan was born while he was in prison. In April 1918 he was placed in charge of a newly formed Sinn Féin Department of Propaganda/Publicity. However, in November 1918 he was arrested in the run-up to the General Election (held in December), in an effort by the British Government to stifle the Sinn Féin election campaign. The election manifesto on which he had worked was "mutilated by the censor" - only about one half of it could be published. He became Sinn Féín National Director of Elections in December 1918. The election turned out to be a resounding success for the party.

He was Under-Secretary of Foreign Affairs, Dáil Éireann, from February 1921 to January 1922. He organised the Irish Race Convention in Paris in 1922.

He was director of publicity for the anti-Treaty Irish Republican Army during the Irish Civil War. He was a founder and a director, in 1934, of The Irish Press newspaper.

His imprisonments and activities greatly fragmented his daughter Maeve's childhood. In her story The Day We Got Our Own Back she recounts her memory of how, when she was five, her home was raided by Free State forces looking for her father, who was on the run. Robert Brennan describes the same incident in his memoir Allegiance.

Robert Brennan was appointed the Irish Free State's first minister to the United States, and the family moved to Washington, D.C. in 1934. He was Minister Plenipotentiary to the US from 1938 to 1947. Robert, his wife, and one of his sons returned to Ireland (his three daughters remained in the United States) when he was appointed Director of Radio Éireann (1947–1948).

He wrote mystery stories as a hobby. He died in Dublin in 1964.

In 2016, Brennan was honored with a monument in Wexford.

Works

Books
The False Fingertip (1921) under the pseudonym Selskar Kearney
The Toledo Dagger (1927), a detective novel
The Man Who Walked like a Dancer
Allegiance (1950) (autobiography)

Plays
Good Night, Mr. O’Donnell (1951)

References

External links
 Notes on Robert Brennan Contains links to other sites.

1881 births
1964 deaths
Irish Republican Army (1922–1969) members
Early Sinn Féin politicians
Writers from County Wexford
The Irish Press people
Ambassadors of Ireland to the United States